Larissa, also known as Neptune VII, is the fifth-closest inner satellite of Neptune. It is named after Larissa, a lover of Poseidon (Neptune) in Greek mythology and eponymous nymph of the city in Thessaly, Greece.

Discovery 
It was first discovered by Harold J. Reitsema, William B. Hubbard, Larry A. Lebofsky and David J. Tholen, based on fortuitous ground-based stellar occultation observations on May 24, 1981, given the temporary designation S/1981 N 1 and announced on May 29, 1981. The moon was recovered and confirmed to be the only object in its orbit during the Voyager 2 flyby in 1989 after which it received the additional designation S/1989 N 2 on August 2, 1989. The announcement by Stephen P. Synnott spoke of “10 frames taken over 5 days”, which gives a recovery date sometime before July 28. The name was given on September 16, 1991.

Characteristics 

The fourth-largest satellite of Neptune, Larissa is irregular (non-spherical) in shape and appears to be heavily cratered, with no sign of any geological modification. It is likely that Larissa, like the other satellites inward of Triton, is a rubble pile re-accreted from fragments of Neptune's original satellites, which were disrupted by perturbations from Triton soon after that moon's capture into a very eccentric initial orbit.

Larissa's orbit is nearly circular and lies below Neptune's synchronous orbit radius, so it is slowly spiralling inward due to tidal deceleration and may eventually impact Neptune's atmosphere, or break up into a planetary ring upon passing its Roche limit due to tidal stretching, similarly to how Triton will eventually collide with Neptune or break into a planetary ring.

Exploration

Larissa has only been visited by Voyager 2. The probe was able to get photographs of Larissa, showing its cratered surface.

Notes

References

External links 

 Larissa Profile by NASA's Solar System Exploration
 Neptune's Known Satellites (by Scott S. Sheppard)

Moons of Neptune
19810524
M